The Jiaozuo–Liuzhou railway or Jiaoliu railway, is a major trunkline railroad in China between Jiaozuo in central China and Liuzhou in southern China. The line was built between 1969 and 1978.  

Major cities along route include Jiaozuo, Jiyuan, Luoyang, Nanyang and Dengzhou in Henan Province; Xiangyang and Jingmen in Hubei Province; Shimen, Zhangjiajie, Jishou and Huaihua in Hunan Province and Liuzhou in the Guangxi Autonomous Region.

History
The Jiaoliu railway was built in northern and southern sections. The northern section from Jiaozuo to Zhicheng Town (in Yidu County-level City, Hubei Province) was built from 1969 to 1970. The southern section from Zhicheng to Liuzhou was built from 1970 to 1978. The two halves were joined in 1988 after the completion of the Zhicheng Yangtze River Bridge.

Electrification of the final section, from Huaihua to Liuzhou, was completed in December 2020.

The Luoyang–Shimen section of the Jiaoliu is part of the Luoyang–Zhanjiang railway

Railway Junctions
The Jiaoliu railway traverses more than a dozen major railways including:

Henan Province
 Jiaozuo (Yueshan station): Taiyuan–Jiaozuo railway, Xinxiang–Yueshan railway
 Jiyuan (Liandong station): Houma–Yueshan railway
 Luoyang: Longhai railway
 Nanyang: Nanjing–Xi'an railway
Hubei Province
 Xiangyang: Xiangyang–Chongqing railway, Hanyang–Danjiangkou railway
 Jingmen: Jingmen–Shashi railway
Hunan Province
 Shimen: Luoyang–Zhanjiang railway, Shimen–Changsha railway
 Huaihua: Shanghai–Kunming railway, Chongqing–Huaihua railway
Guangxi Zhuang Autonomous Region
 Liuzhou: Hunan–Guangxi railway, Guizhou–Guangxi railway

See also

 List of railways in China

References

Railway lines in China
Rail transport in Henan
Rail transport in Hubei
Rail transport in Hunan
Rail transport in Guangxi